Danville School District may refer to:
 Danville School District (Arkansas), located in Danville, Arkansas.
 Danville School District No. 118, in Danville, Illinois
 Danville Community School Corporation, located in Danville, Indiana.
 Danville Schools, located in Danville, Kentucky.
 Danville Local Schools, located in Danville, Ohio.
 Danville Area School District, located in Danville, Pennsylvania.
 Danville School District (Vermont), located in Danville, Vermont.